Nicolás Carlos Bossicovich (born 27 June 1969, in Rosario) is an Argentine former rugby union player and coach. He played as a lock. He is professionally an architect.

Bossicovich played all his career at Gimnastica y Esgrima Rosario. In 1997, he was suspended for 18 months after incidents in a game with Jockey Club de Rosario.

He had 2 caps for Argentina, in 1995, without scoring. He was called for the 1995 Rugby World Cup, but never played.

After finishing his player career, he became a coach. He was first in charge of GE Rosario, being assigned for the Unión de Rugby de Rosario, from 2003 to 2005. He resigned in 2005 for professional reasons.

References

External links

1969 births
Living people
Argentine rugby union players
Argentina international rugby union players
Argentine rugby union coaches
Rugby union locks
Sportspeople from Rosario, Santa Fe